Gandandre Gandu is a 1989 Indian Kannada-language film,  directed by  V. Somashekar and produced by H. N. Maruthi. The film stars Ambareesh, Nalini, Jai Jagadish and Thoogudeepa Srinivas. The film has musical score by G. K. Venkatesh.

Cast

Ambareesh
Nalini
Jai Jagadish
Thoogudeepa Srinivas
Dinesh
Shakti Prasad
Musuri Krishnamurthy
Brahmavar
Prasanna (Prasanna Kumar)
B. K. Shankar
Muni Krishnappa
Guggu
Roopadevi
K. Vijaya
Shashikala
Chandrashekar
Seetharam
Sathish
Anand
Thipatur Siddaramaiah
Karanth
Mandeep Roy
Master Naveen

Soundtrack
The music was composed by G. K. Venkatesh.

References

External links
 

1989 films
1980s Kannada-language films
Films scored by G. K. Venkatesh
Films directed by V. Somashekhar